Heinrich Albert Schnee (Albert Hermann Heinrich Schnee; 4 February 1871 – 23 June 1949) was a German lawyer, colonial civil servant, politician, writer, and association official. He served as the last Governor of German East Africa.

Early life and education 
Schnee was born in Neuhaldensleben, the son of the district court Councillor Hermann Schnee (1829–1901) and his wife Emily (née Scheibe). He attended high school in Nordhausen, and studied law in Heidelberg (as a member of the Corps Rhenania Heidelberg), Kiel, and Berlin (Dr. jur., 1893).

Career 
In 1897, he began working in the Federal Foreign Office, and in 1898 he became a judge and the Deputy Governor of German New Guinea. In 1900, he became a District Officer and Deputy Governor of German Samoa. When in New York, Schnee, in 1901 married Ada Adeline Woodhill (1873-1969), a New Zealand actress of English and Irish extraction. 

After 1904 he again served as a Legation Councillor in the Colonial Department of the Foreign Office in Germany. In 1905 he became Colonial Advisory Councilor of the embassy in London, in 1906 Lecturing Councillor, and in 1907 Dirigent. From 1911 onwards he was Ministerial Director and head of the political and administrative division in the Imperial Colonial Office in Berlin.

Governor of German East Africa 

From 1912 to 1918 Schnee served as the last Governor of German East Africa. His tenure was marked by the outbreak of the First World War. As Governor he held supreme military command. However, he soon disagreed with the commander of the Schutztruppe, General Paul von Lettow-Vorbeck, on defensive strategy. Ultimately von Lettow-Vorbeck prevailed with his guerrilla tactics and increasingly assumed control of operations. Schnee, besides his administrative responsibilities, also had to reconcile his family, and according to Wilhelm Methner, who served under the governorship of Schnee as First Secretary, "the wife of the governor, who was English by birth, suffered the bitter fate of seeing the sons of her fatherland and of her adoptive country in battle against each other. This brave and upright woman had to bear with much hostility". On 2 March 1919, Schnee and Lettow-Vorbeck led the returning fighters from East Africa through the Brandenburg Gate in Berlin.

Political activity 

After the First World War, Schnee was a member of the parliament (Reichstag). He represented the German People's Party, from which he resigned in 1932. There were some press speculations in 1932 about Schnee becoming Chancellor. From 1933 to 1945 he again held a Reichstag seat, now for the Nazi Party. An active colonial policy as understood by Schnee, the reason for his continued involvement in politics, was not among the new rulers' interests.

Schnee was also internationally known as a leading representative of German colonial interests and was repeatedly invited to lectures in the United States and other European countries. He was appointed to the League of Nations' Manchuria Commission (the Lytton Commission) which negotiated with China and Japan regarding their military conflict over influence in Manchuria and reported to the League of Nations.

Association official 

In 1926, Schnee became the president of the Federation of Germans abroad, a position he held till 1933. From 1930 to 1936 he served as the (last) President of the German Colonial Society (DKG) which then was supplanted by the Reichskolonialbund (RKB). After the Second World War, the Allies considered Schnee incriminated because he had held a Nazi Party Reichstag seat, and he could not continue his work. He died in 1949 in a car accident in Berlin and was buried in a cemetery near the highway.

Historical assessment 

Heinrich Schnee is one of the figures in German colonial revisionism. Through publication of books and essays, as a politician, and as a federation official and lecturer, he tried to give the "colonial question" national importance and to promote the recovery of the former colonial territories. With the Gleichschaltung of the colonial associations in 1936 it became clear that his influence was gone. Schnee was not considered for a position in the RKB and he did not join the new association.

Awards and honors 

 1925: Dr. rer. pol. h.c. from the University of Hamburg
 1941: Eagle Shield of the German Reich

Publications 

 Bilder aus der Südsee. Unter den kannibalischen Stämmen des Bismarck-Archipels (Images from the South Seas. Among the cannibal tribes of the Bismarck Archipelago). Reimer, Berlin 1904.
 Deutsch-Ostafrika im Weltkriege. Wie wir lebten und kämpften (German East Africa during the World War. How we lived and fought.). Quelle and Meyer, Leipzig 1919.
 Deutsches Koloniallexikon (German colonial lexicon) (Ed.), Quelle and Meyer, Leipzig 1920
 Braucht Deutschland Kolonien? (Does Germany Need Colonies?). Quelle and Meyer, Leipzig 1921
 Die koloniale Schuldlüge (The lie of the colonial guilt). Sachers and Kuschel, Berlin 1924
 English: German Colonization Past and Future. The Truth about the German Colonies, Nachdruck Kennikat Press, Port Washington/London 1970.
 Spanish: La colonización alemana: El pasado y el future. La verdad sobre los colonias alemanes, con un prologo de José Vasconcelos. München, Editore Internacional 1929.
 Italian: La colonizzazione germanica: Il suo passato ed il suo futuro translated from the English translation of 1926. Santoro, Rom 1932.
 Italian: La menzonga inglese della colpa colonial, Vallecchi, Florenz 1941.
 Nationalismus und Imperialismus (Nationalism and Imperialism), Reimar Hobbing, Berlin 1928.
 Zehn Jahre Versailles (Ten Years of Versailles) (Ed., with Hans Draeger), 3 volumes, Brückenverlag, Berlin 1929/30
 Völker und Mächte im Fernen Osten. Eindrücke von einer Reise mit der Mandschurei-Kommission (Peoples and powers in the Far East. Impressions from a voyage with the Manchuria Commission). Deutsche Buch-Gemeinschaft, Berlin 1933
 Die deutschen Kolonien vor, in und nach dem Weltkrieg (The German colonies before, during and after the Great War) Quelle and Meyer, Leipzig 1935
 Deutschlands koloniale Forderung (Germany's colonial claim). Wendt, Berlin 1937.
 Kolonialmacht Deutschland (Germany, colonial power), German Youth Library No. 679-681, Verlag H.Hilger, Berlin 1940.
 Als letzter Gouverneur in Deutsch-Ostafrika – Erinnerungen (As the last governor of German East Africa - Memories), Ed. Ada Schnee, Quelle und Meyer, Heidelberg 1964

References 

 Hans Draeger (ed.): Gouverneur Schnee. Ein Künder und Mehrer deutscher Geltung. Zu seinem 60. Geburtstag... (Governor Schnee. An announcer and promoter of German standing. On his 60th Birthday) Stilke, Berlin 1931.
 
 Biographisches Handbuch des deutschen Auswärtigen Dienstes 1871–1945. (Biographical Handbook of the German Foreign Service 1871-1945) Volume 4: S. Published by Auswärtiges Amt, Historischer Dienst, ed.: Bernd Isphording, Gerhard Keiper, Martin Kröger. Schöningh, Paderborn u. a. 2012,

External links 
 
 Literature by and about Heinrich Schnee at the German National Library
 Heinrich Schnee in the database of members of the Reichstag
 

Nazi Party politicians
Governors of German East Africa
1871 births
1949 deaths
Members of the Reichstag of Nazi Germany
Members of the Reichstag of the Weimar Republic
East African Campaign (World War I)
German People's Party politicians
People from Haldensleben
Road incident deaths in Germany